Munuk Airport  is a regional airport located in Ayan, Khabarovsk Krai, Russia.

Airlines and destinations

References

Airports in Khabarovsk Krai